Promised Land is the twenty-first studio album by American singer and musician Elvis Presley, released by RCA Records on January 8, 1975. It was recorded in December 1973 at Stax Records studios in Memphis and released on Presley's 40th birthday in January, 1975. In the US the album reached number 47 on the Billboard Top 200 chart and number 1 in Billboards Top Country LPs chart, as well as the Cashbox Country albums chart. In the UK the album reached #21.

Content
The material was the second pick from the December 1973 session, as the songs considered strongest had been issued on Good Times. The title track, a cover of the 1965 hit by Chuck Berry, was issued earlier as a single on September 27, 1974, and hit number 14 on the Billboard Hot 100 and the UK top ten. Its flip side, "It's Midnight", reached 9 on the Country Charts. Another hit single from the album was "If You Talk in Your Sleep" reaching 17 on the Billboard Hot 100. "Promised Land" was used for the 1997 film Men in Black.

Reissues
In 2011, the FTD (Follow That Dream) collectors label released an expanded, 48-track version of the album including outtakes.

Track listing

Original release

Follow That Dream CD reissue

Personnel

 Elvis Presley – lead vocals, harmony vocals on "Promised Land"
 James Burton – lead guitar
 Johnny Christopher – rhythm guitar
 Charlie Hodge – acoustic rhythm guitar 
 Jeannie Green – backing vocals
 David Briggs – piano, Hammond organ, overdubbed tambourine on "Promised Land"
 Per Erik "Pete" Hallin – piano on "Help Me" and "Love Song of the Year", Wurlitzer electric piano on "I’ve Got a Feelin’ In My Body", clavinet on "Promised Land"
 Mary and Ginger Holladay – backing vocals
 Susan Pilkington – backing vocals
 Norbert Putnam – bass guitar
 Ron Tutt – drums
 Voice (Donnie Sumner, Sherrill Nielsen, Tim Baty, Per Eric "Pete" Hallin) – backing vocals
 JD Sumner & The Stamps (Bill Baize, Ed Enoch, David Rowland) – backing vocals
 Kathy Westmoreland – backing vocalsOverdubbed Dennis Linde, Alan Rush – guitar on "Promised Land"
 Bobby Ogdin – piano on "Promised Land"
 Randy Cullers – cowbell on "Promised Land"
 Mike Leech – string and brass arrangements 
 Bobby Taylor – oboeTechnical'
 Felton Jarvis – producer
 Mike Moran, Dick Baxter, Al Pachucki, Mickey Crofford – engineers

Charts

Weekly charts

Year-end charts

References

External links

Elvis Presley albums
1975 albums
Albums produced by Felton Jarvis
RCA Records albums